Bhiyani is a village in the Bhind District of Madhya Pradesh, India. It is located in the Gohad tehsil and the Phanda block. gohad Subdistric is located nearby.

Demographics 

According to the 2011 census of India, Bakaniya has 329 households. The effective literacy rate (i.e. the literacy rate of population excluding children aged 6 and below) is 75.29%.

References 

Villages in Huzur tehsil